Margalitia shackletonii is a bacterium from the genus of Margalitia which has been isolated from volcanic soil from the Candlemas Island.

References

Bacillaceae
Bacteria described in 2004